Whitegate may refer to one of the following villages:

Whitegate, Cheshire, England
Whitegate, County Clare, Ireland
Whitegate, County Cork, Ireland
Whitegate, Greater Manchester, England

See also

Whitegates, Isle of Man